Eumetula michaelseni is a species of sea snail, a gastropod in the family Newtoniellidae. It was described by Strebel, in 1905.

Description 
The maximum recorded shell length is 4.4 mm.

Habitat 
Minimum recorded depth is 0 m. Maximum recorded depth is 96 m.

References

Newtoniellidae
Gastropods described in 1905